Vinzons Pilot High School is a public high school in the town of Vinzons Camarines Norte, Philippines.  It was founded in 1946.

Vinzons Pilot High School offers specialized curriculum approved by the Department of Science and Technology and the Department of Education.

History
The school was first founded in a house on Macmaster Street in 1946, then named Camarines Norte High School.  Initially 119 students were divided into four sections. Classes were held six days a week through the school year. In July 1947, classes were transferred to the residence of Carlos Ascotia on the same street.

In 1948, the school moved to a new site on the town's outskirts.

On August 6, 1993, the multi-purpose Student Pavilion was built near the school gate (solicited by GARBO of Vinzons) from the CDF of Congressman Emmanuel Pimentel. On July 6, 1994, ground was broken on a mini park at the back of the JICA building.

References

 Vinzons Pilot High School

Schools in Camarines Norte

External links 
 Vinzons Pilot High School
 Vinzons Pilot High School - JHS

Schools in Camarines Norte